Thelma Dorothy Coyne Long (née Coyne; 14 October 1918 – 13 April 2015) was an Australian tennis player and one of the female players who dominated Australian tennis from the mid-1930s to the 1950s. During her career, she won 19 Grand Slam tournament titles. In 2013, Long was inducted into the International Tennis Hall of Fame.

Tennis career

At the Australian Championships, Long won singles titles in 1952 and 1954 and was a singles finalist in 1940, 1951, 1955 and 1956. In women's doubles, she won 10 titles with Nancye Wynne Bolton (1936, 1937, 1938, 1939, 1940, 1947, 1948, 1949, 1951 and 1952) and two titles with Mary Bevis Hawton (1956 and 1958). Long was a women's doubles finalist with Bolton in 1946 and 1950. She won mixed doubles titles in 1951, 1952 and 1955 with George Worthington and in 1954 with Rex Hartwig. She was a mixed doubles finalist in 1948 with Bill Sidwell.

At Wimbledon, Long was a women's doubles finalist in 1957 with Hawton and a mixed doubles finalist in 1952 with Enrique Morea. At the age of 52, Long teamed with Lorraine Coghlan to lose in the first round of women's doubles at Wimbledon in 1971.

At the French Championships, Long was a women's doubles finalist in 1958 with Hawton, won the mixed doubles title in 1956 with Luis Ayala, and was a mixed doubles finalist in 1951 with Mervyn Rose.

At the 1953 tournament in Cincinnati, Long won the singles title (defeating Anita Kanter 7–5, 6–2 in the final) and the women's doubles title with Kanter.

According to Lance Tingay of The Daily Telegraph and the Daily Mail, Long was ranked in the world top 10 in 1952 and 1954 (no rankings issued from 1940 to 1945), reaching a career high of World No. 7 in these rankings in 1952.

Long became a teaching professional in 1960 and spent many years coaching junior players in New South Wales. In 1985, her achievements were recognized by Tennis NSW when she was awarded Life Membership of the State Association.

Honours and awards
On 30 August 2000, Long was awarded the Australian Sports Medal. She was inducted into the Australian Tennis Hall of Fame in a ceremony at Melbourne Park during the Australian Open on Australia Day in 2002. In 2013, she was inducted into the International Tennis Hall of Fame.

Personal life
She was born in Sydney, Australia on 14 October 1918, the only child of Tom and Dorrie Coyne and was schooled at the Sydney Girls High School.

On 30 January 1941, she married Maurice Newton Long of Melbourne. The marriage did not continue after the end of the Second World War.

In May 1941, during the Second World War, Long joined the Red Cross as a transport driver and worked in Melbourne. On 19 February 1942, she joined the Australian Women's Army Service (AWAS) and rose to the rank of captain in April 1944. For her service in the AWAS, she was awarded the War Medal 1939–1945 and Australia Service Medal 1939–1945.

Long worked as a volunteer at the State Library of New South Wales, and she received the Volunteer Service Award in 1999.

Coyne died on 13 April 2015 at the age of 96.

Grand Slam tournament finals

Singles: 6 (2 wins, 4 losses)

Doubles: 16 (12 wins, 4 losses)

Mixed doubles (5 wins, 3 losses)

Grand Slam singles tournament timeline

R = tournament restricted to French nationals and held under German occupation.

1 In 1946 and 1947, the French Championships were held after Wimbledon.
2,3 Coyne did not play. Her opponent got a walkover.

See also 
 Performance timelines for all female tennis players who reached at least one Grand Slam final

References

External links
 Australian Women – biographical entry
 
 

1918 births
2015 deaths
Australian Championships (tennis) champions
Australian female tennis players
Australian Army officers
Australian Army personnel of World War II
French Championships (tennis) champions
Sportswomen from New South Wales
Tennis players from Sydney
Grand Slam (tennis) champions in women's singles
Grand Slam (tennis) champions in women's doubles
Grand Slam (tennis) champions in mixed doubles
Grand Slam (tennis) champions in girls' singles
International Tennis Hall of Fame inductees
Women in the Australian military
Australian Championships (tennis) junior champions
People educated at Sydney Girls High School
20th-century Australian women